Black Stump is a prominent but low mountain 4.5 nautical miles (8 km) southeast of Monte Cassino in the Freyberg Mountains. The feature is a black peaked mass of andesite rock, possibly the stump of an old volcano. Descriptively named by New Zealand Antarctic Research Program (NZARP) geologist P.J. Oliver, who studied the mountain in the 1981–82 season.

References

Geography of Antarctica